The International Clothing Workers' Federation (IGWF) was a global union federation representing workers involved in making and repairing clothes.

History
The federation was established in 1893 at a conference in Zurich. The following year, it established headquarters in Berlin, moving to Amsterdam in 1920. It held conferences in different European locations every three to four years. In 1925, the International Furriers' Secretariat merged into the organisation, giving the organisation 29 affiliates with a total of 315,000 members.

The federation ceased to operate during World War II, but was re-established in 1946, based in London.  In 1949, it was refounded as the International Garment Workers' Federation, which in 1960 merged with the International Federation of Textile Workers' Associations to form the International Textile and Garment Workers' Federation.

Affiliates
In 1954, the following unions were affiliated to the federation:

Leadership

General Secretaries
1894: Clara Zetkin
1900: Heinrich Stühmer
1920: Tonnis van der Heeg
1946: Andrew Conley
1949: Ian Milner
1956: John Newton

Presidents
1910s: William P. Arup
1920: Martin Plettl
1933: Josef Andersson
as of 1957: Per Petterson

References

Global union federations
Clothing industry trade unions
Trade unions established in 1893
Trade unions disestablished in 1960